Koumpentoum is a town and commune in the Tambacounda Region of central Senegal. In 2013 it had a population of some 10,000

Transport 
It is served by a station on the national railway network.

See also 
 Railway stations in Senegal

References 

Populated places in Tambacounda Region
Communes of Senegal